"Solid Gold" is a song by Pnau featuring Kira Divine & Marques Toliver and released in May 2019 as the lead single from the band's forthcoming sixth studio album. The song was previewed in 2018 at their Splendour in the Grass set.

At the ARIA Music Awards of 2019, the song was nominated for ARIA Award for Best Dance Release and ARIA Award for Best Video.

At the APRA Music Awards of 2020, "Solid Gold" was nominated for Most Performed Dance Work of the Year.

At the AIR Awards of 2020, the song was nominated for Best Independent Dance, Electronica or Club Single.

Reception
Sose Fuamoli from Triple J said "'Solid Gold' falls perfectly in line with Pnau's stable of bright and uplifting dance music." Amnplify said "The song was inspired equal parts by Nick Littlemore's explorations into world music and the sun drenched energy of Australia, incorporating live instrumentation to create a richer, fuller sound. It's a banger built to soundtrack good." auspOp put the song "straight into the pile of the year's best" calling it "a sparkling mid-tempo disco-pop number with pulsing beats, a sharp piano line and soulful vocals."

Charts

Certifications

Release history

References

2018 songs
2019 singles
Pnau songs
Songs written by Nick Littlemore
Songs written by Peter Mayes
Songs written by Sam Littlemore